Mamdooh El-Attar (14 July 1926 – February 2005) was an Egyptian rower. He competed in the men's coxed four event at the 1952 Summer Olympics.

References

1926 births
2005 deaths
Egyptian male rowers
Olympic rowers of Egypt
Rowers at the 1952 Summer Olympics
Place of birth missing